Masmo metro station is a station on the red line of the Stockholm metro, located in Masmo, Vårby, Huddinge Municipality. The station was opened on 1 October 1972 as part of the extension from Vårberg to Fittja. It was the first of the "grottstations" (cave-stations).

References

External links

Kynerd.net, Images of Masmo

Red line (Stockholm metro) stations
Railway stations opened in 1972

es:Masmo#La estación de Metro de Masmo